The Accusing Toe is a 1918 American short comedy film directed by King Vidor.

Cast
 Sadie Clayton
 Dale Faith
 Wharton Jones

References

External links

1918 films
American silent short films
Films directed by King Vidor
Silent American comedy films
1918 comedy films
1918 short films
American black-and-white films
American comedy short films
1910s American films
1910s English-language films
English-language comedy films